The canton of Vic-le-Comte is an administrative division of the Puy-de-Dôme department, central France. Its borders were modified at the French canton reorganisation which came into effect in March 2015. Its seat is in Vic-le-Comte.

It consists of the following communes:
 
Busséol
Chadeleuf
Coudes
Laps
Manglieu
Montpeyroux
Mirefleurs
Neschers
Parent
Pérignat-sur-Allier
Pignols
Plauzat
La Roche-Noire
Saint-Georges-sur-Allier
Saint-Maurice
Sallèdes
Sauvagnat-Sainte-Marthe
Vic-le-Comte
Yronde-et-Buron

References

Cantons of Puy-de-Dôme